Philip VI, Count of Waldeck (4 October 1551 – 9 November 1579 in Darmstadt) was a canon in  Strasbourg and also the ruling Count of Waldeck-Landau.

Life 
He was the eldest son of Count John I of Waldeck-Landau and his wife, Anna of Lippe.

He studied at the University of Marburg together with his younger brother Francis III.  He completed his studies in 1569.  In 1567, his uncle Philip V had waived a position as canon in Strasbourg in his favour.

His father died in 1567, and as the eldest son, he inherited Waldeck-Landau.  He resided in Arolsen.

Philip VI died in 1579 in Darmstadt and was buried in the city church there.  He mother ordered a stone to be placed over his grave.  As he had no children, he was succeeded as Count by his younger brother Francis III.

References 
 Adolph Theodor Ludwig Varnhagen: Grundlage der Waldeckischen Landes- und Regentengeschichte, vol. 2, Arolsen, 1853, p. 174 ff

External links 
Descriptions of his grave stone and coat of arms

Counts of Waldeck
House of Waldeck
1551 births
1579 deaths
16th-century German people